In chemistry, the amino radical, also known as the aminyl radical or azanyl radical, is the neutral form of the amide ion. Aminyl radicals are highly reactive and consequently short-lived, like most radicals; however, they form an important part of nitrogen chemistry. In sufficiently high concentration, amino radicals dimerise to form hydrazine.  While  as a functional group is common in nature, forming a part of many compounds (e.g. the phenethylamines), the radical cannot be isolated in its free form.

Synthesis

Reaction 1: Formation of amino radical from ammonia

Amino radicals can be produced by reacting OH radical with ammonia in irradiated aqueous solutions. This reaction is formulated as a hydrogen abstraction reaction.

NH3{} +{} ^\mathbf{\bullet}OH -> {}^\mathbf{\bullet}NH2{} + H2O

This rate was redetermined by using two-pulse radiolysis competition methods with benzoate and thiocyanate ions at pH 11.4. A value of k1 =  was obtained from both systems.

Reaction 2: Formation of amino radical from hydroxylamine

The amino radical may also be produced by reaction of e−(aq) with hydroxylamine.

Ti^{III}{} + NH2OH -> Ti^{IV}{} + {}^\mathbf{\bullet}NH2{} + OH-

Reaction 3: Formation of amino radical from ammoniumyl

Reduction of hydroxylamine by e−(aq) has also been suggested to produce the amino radical in the following reaction.

^\mathbf{\bullet}NH3+ <=> {}^\mathbf{\bullet}NH2{} + H+

The reactivity of the amino radical in this reaction is expected to be pH dependent and should occur in the region of pH 3–7.

Properties

Electronic states 
The amino radical has two characteristic electronic states:

The more stable electronic state is 2B1, where the unpaired electron is in the p-orbital perpendicular to the plane of the molecule (π type radical). The high energy electronic state, 2A1, has the two electrons in the p-orbital and the unpaired electron in the sp2 orbital (σ type radical).

Nitrogen centered compounds, such as amines, are nucleophilic in nature. This character is also seen in amino radicals, which can be considered to be nucleophilic species.

Spectral properties 
The amino radical only exhibits a very low optical absorption in the visible region (λmax = 530 nm, εmax = ), while its absorption in the UV (<260 nm) is similar to that of OH. Due to this, it is impractical to determine the rate of reaction of the amino radical with organic compounds by following the decay of the amino radical.

Reactivity 
In general, amino radicals are highly reactive and short lived; however, this is not the case when reacted with some organic molecules. Relative reactivities of the amino radical with several organic compounds have been reported, but the absolute rate constants for such reactions remain unknown. In reaction 1, it was hypothesized that the amino radical might possibly react with NH3 more rapidly than OH and might oxidize  to produce the amino radical in acid solutions, given that radicals are stronger oxidants than OH. In order to test this, sulfate and phosphate radical anions were used. The sulfate and phosphate radical anions were found to react more slowly with NH3 than does the amino radical and they react with ammonia by hydrogen abstraction and not by electron transfer oxidation.

When the amino radical is reacted with benzoate ions, the rate constant is very low and only a weak absorption in the UV spectra is observed, indicating that amino radicals do not react with benzene rapidly. Phenol, on the other hand, was found to react more rapidly with the amino radical. This reaction can produce phenoxyl radicals via two possible mechanisms:

 Addition to the ring followed by elimination of NH3, or
 Oxidation by direct electron transfer

While the amino radical is known to be weakly reactive, the recombination process of two amino radicals to form hydrazine appears to be one of the fastest. As a result, it often competes with other NH2 reactions.

NH2 +  NH2 → N2H4

At low pressures, this reaction is the fastest and therefore the principal mode of NH2 disappearance.

See also 
Amide
Amine
Radical (chemistry)
Hydrazine (dimer)

References

Further reading

Inorganic compounds
Free radicals